The 2014 Stephen F. Austin Lumberjacks baseball team represents Stephen F. Austin State University in the 2014 intercollegiate baseball season. Stephen F. Austin competes in Division I of the National Collegiate Athletic Association (NCAA) as a member of the Southland Conference. The Lumberjacks play home games at Jaycees Field in Nacogdoches, Texas. Sixth year head coach Johnny Cardenas leads the Lumberjacks, a former assistant coach with the Lumberjacks from 2005 through 2008.

Personnel

Coaches

Players

Schedule

Notes

References

External links

Stephen F. Austin Lumberjacks baseball seasons
Houston
Stephen F. Austin